Yakalı is a village in the Atkaracalar District of Çankırı Province in Turkey. Its population is 68 (2021).

References

Villages in Atkaracalar District